The World Log Lift Championships (sometimes referred to as World Log Lift Challenge) is a (mostly) annual competition featuring strength athletes from all over the world, competing exclusively in the log clean and press. Created initially as part of the Strongman Champions League, it has since been part of Giants Live and the championship occasionally switches between the two series.

History
In its inaugural year, the Strongman Champions League introduced the World Log Lift Championships. The event had been a staple of strongman competitions since the early 1980s. Beginning with the 1980 World's Strongest Man contest, where Bill Kazmaier hoisted 157 kg to win the event and set a world record. Over eight years Kazmaier increased the record to 170 kg. Jamie Reeves, winner of the 1989 World's Strongest Man contest, managed 177 kg in 1989, and 180 kg at the 1992 World Mighty Man contest in Johannesburg, South Africa..

It was ten years before 2001 World's Strongest Man winner Svend Karlsen set a new record of 185 kg at the Strongman Super Series event in Sweden. In 2003, Hugo Girard set a new record at the Strongman Super Series event in Canada with 186 kg. In 2004, Žydrūnas Savickas set a new record of 188 kg, and Raimunds Bergmanis brought the record up to 190 kg at the Strongman Super Series event in Moscow.

Savickas began his long reign over the log lift world record starting in 2005, bringing it up to 200 kg in Hungary, and then again at the 2005 IFSA European Championships in Riga, Latvia with 202.5 kg. Savickas set another new record in 2006, bringing it up to 205 kg.

In 2008 Savickas broke the record twice more, with marks of 207.5 kg and 210 kg. Savickas set yet another world record of 212.5 kg at the 2009 World Log Lift Championship.

Savickas set another world record of 215 kg, set at the 2011 SCL Finals in Sarajevo, Bosnia on 7 February 2012, and another world record of 216 kg by Savickas and was set at the 2012 Europe's Strongest Man contest in Leeds, England on 23 June 2012. Savickas set yet another world record of 217.5 kg at the SCL Holland event in Zevenaar, Netherlands on 30 June 2012.

Savickas' final world record of 2012 was 220 kg, set during the finals of the 2012 World's Strongest Man contest which he eventually won, marking his third WSM title, marking Savickas' tenth consecutive log lift world record.

In 2013, Savickas set another world record at the 2013 Europe's Strongest Man in Leeds, England with a lift of 221 kg. The world record was at 228kg, set by Savickas in 2015 in Brazil, marking his sixteenth break of the world record.

The current world record is 229kg set by Cheick "Iron Biby" Sanou in 2021 at the Giants live World tour final, in Scotland (Glasgow).

Champions

Heaviest Lifts

In History

At the Championships

Continental records

1 Cheick Sanou, who is a Canadian citizen, has the heaviest lift for this region at 229kg, but is not listed as he has declared for Burkina Faso.

Individual Results

NOTE: When competitors finish on the same weight, the results are sorted by the competitors' body weights with the lightest being given a higher position.

2008
Zydrunas Savickas entered the 2008 Log Lift World Championships as the clear favorite, and intended to set a new record with 212.5 kg. Savickas' competitors included Mikhail Koklyaev, Ervin Katona, Sebastian Wenta, Oleksandr Lashyn, Tobias Ide, Agris Kazelniks, Oleksandr Pekanaov, Krzysztof Radzikowski and Saulius Brusokas.

The competition, held in Lithuania, saw each lift judged by three officials similar to Powerlifting and Olympic Weightlifting. The referees were Strongman Champions League founders Ilkka Kinnunen, Marcel Mostert and Latvian weighlifter Viktors Ščerbatihs, who had won the bronze medal in the +105 kg superheavyweight class at the recent Beijing Olympics. One of the strongest contenders, Oleksandr Pekanov, who had a personal best of 190 kg missed his opener of 180 kg three times. However, a number of other athletes came away with personal records, and two National Records were set. Zydrunas Savickas missed his world record attempt of 212.5 kg, but won the championships with his lift of 200 kg.

Results

Records

Source of results:

2009
The championships took place in Kaunas, Lithuania on 21 November 2009.

Results

Records

Source of results:

2010
The Log Lift Championships were not held in 2010, and was moved up to February 2011 to kick off the 2011 season of SCL.

2011
The 2011 World Log Lift Championships were held in Siemens Arena in Vilnius, Lithuania on 12 February 2011 to kick off the 2011 SCL season. Key competitors were reigning champion Zydrunas Savickas, Vidas Blekaitis and Vytautas Lalas who finished in the top 3 places respectively, with Zavickas winning his 3rd straight log lift title. There were 12 athletes in total, 3 athletes failed their opening weight on all 3 attempts.
The event was broadcast live on Eurosport.

Results

Records

2012
The 2012 World Log Lift Championships were held in Siemens Arena in Vilnius, Lithuania on Sunday 7 October 2012.

Results

Records

2013
The 2013 World Log Lift Championships were held in Siemens Arena in Vilnius, Lithuania on Saturday 19 October 2013. Savickas set a new world record with a lift of 222.5 kg.

Results

Records

2015
The 2015 World Log Lift Championships were held at the Keepmoat Stadium in Doncaster, England on 14 February 2015. Savickas attempted to set a new world record with a lift of 228kg but narrowly failed.

Results

Records

2016
The 2016 World Log Lift Championships were held at the SCL Lithuania event in Vilnius.

Results

Records

2017
The 2017 World Log Lift Championships were held at the SCL Lithuania event in Vilnius.

Results

2018
The 2018 World Log Lift Championships were held at the First Direct Arena in Leeds, England, as the opening event for Europe's Strongest Man. Two strongmen attempted to set a new world record with a lift of 230kg but both failed.

Records

2019
In 2019, there were two World Log Lift Championships, the first of which was held at the First Direct Arena in Leeds, England, again, as the opening event for Europe's Strongest Man. Cheick "Iron Biby" Sanou attempted to set a new world record with a lift of 229kg but narrowly failed. The second championship was run by the World Log Lift Federation in Lithuania

Results (Giants Live)

Records (Giants Live)

Results (World Log Lift Federation)

Records (World Log Lift Federation)

2021
The 2021 World Log Lift Championships were held at the First Direct Arena in Leeds, England, as the opening event for Europe's Strongest Man.

Results

2022
The 2022 World Log Lift Championships were held at the First Direct Arena in Leeds, England, as the opening event for Europe's Strongest Man.

Results

See also 
Europe's Strongest Man
Giants Live
Strongman Champions League
Žydrūnas Savickas
The World Deadlift Championships

References

External links 

Official Site of Strongman Champions League
Official Site of Giants Live

Strongmen competitions